The Rock Island Railway Depot is a historic train station building on 3rd Street in Fordyce, Arkansas.  Built c. 1925 by the Rock Island Railroad, it is one of two brick railroad stations to survive from the period in Dallas County.  It is a large rectangular structure with a cross-gable tile roof.  The building continues to be used by the Fordyce and Princeton Railroad to manage the shipment of lumber products.

The building was listed on the National Register of Historic Places in 1983.

See also
National Register of Historic Places listings in Dallas County, Arkansas

References

Railway stations on the National Register of Historic Places in Arkansas
Railway stations in the United States opened in 1925
Buildings and structures in Fordyce, Arkansas
National Register of Historic Places in Dallas County, Arkansas
Fordyce
Former railway stations in Arkansas